The Florida Marlins' 2001 season was the ninth season for the Major League Baseball (MLB) franchise in the National League.  It would begin with the team attempting to improve on their season from 2000. Their managers were John Boles and Tony Pérez. They played home games at Pro Player Stadium. They finished with a record of 76-86, 4th in the National League East.

Offseason
 November 13, 2000: Matt Treanor was signed as a free agent with the Florida Marlins.
 December 18, 2000: Charles Johnson was signed as a free agent by the Marlins.
 March 28, 2001: Mark Kotsay was traded by the Florida Marlins with Cesar Crespo to the San Diego Padres for Matt Clement, Eric Owens, and Omar Ortíz (minors).

Regular season

Season standings

Record vs. opponents

Notable transactions
April 9, 2001: John Mabry was sent to the Florida Marlins by the St. Louis Cardinals as part of a conditional deal.

Citrus Series
The annual interleague games between the Florida Marlins and the Tampa Bay Devil Rays were played in June and July. They are known as the Citrus Series. The Marlins won the series 4-2.
June 15- @ Marlins 7- Devil Rays 4 
June 16- @ Marlins 11- Devil Rays 0 
June 17- @ Marlins 6- Devil Rays 4 
July 6- @ Devil Rays 5- Marlins 4 (11 innings) 
July 7- @ Devil Rays 4- Marlins 3 
July 8- Marlins 6- @ Devil Rays 1

Roster

Player stats

Batting

Starters by position 
Note: Pos = Position; G = Games played; AB = At bats; H = Hits; Avg. = Batting average; HR = Home runs; RBI = Runs batted in

Other batters 
Note: G = Games played; AB = At bats; H = Hits; Avg. = Batting average; HR = Home runs; RBI = Runs batted in

Pitching

Starting pitchers 
Note: G = Games pitched; IP = Innings pitched; W = Wins; L = Losses; ERA = Earned run average; SO = Strikeouts

Other pitchers 
Note: G = Games pitched; IP = Innings pitched; W = Wins; L = Losses; ERA = Earned run average; SO = Strikeouts

Relief pitchers 
Note: G = Games pitched; W = Wins; L = Losses; SV = Saves; ERA = Earned run average; SO = Strikeouts

Farm system

LEAGUE CHAMPIONS: Kane County; LEAGUE CO-CHAMPIONS: Brevard County

References

External links
2001 Florida Marlins at Baseball Reference
2001 Florida Marlins at Baseball Almanac

Miami Marlins seasons
Florida Marlins season
Florida Marlins